Kjærlighetsviser is an album of love songs by the Norwegian singer Elisabeth Andreassen.  It was released in Norway on October 1, 2001.

Track listing
"Vi vandrar saman"
"Kjærlighetsvisa"
"Dains me dæ"
"Ingen er så nydelig som du"
"Har en drøm"
"Lys og varme"
"Tusen bitar"
"Neste sommer"
"Vinsjan på kaia"
" ser"
"En natt forbi"

Charts

References

2001 albums
Elisabeth Andreassen albums